John Mason was master of the Prince of Wales a transport ship in the First Fleet, assigned to transport convicts for the European colonisation of Australia.

Prince of Wales left Portsmouth on 13 May 1787, carrying 47 female convicts. Six days later two male convicts were also transferred aboard; the ringleaders of a failed mutiny aboard fellow First Fleet transport Scarborough. The Fleet arrived at Port Jackson, Sydney, Australia, on 26 January 1788.

Mason's ship left Port Jackson on 14 August 1788, and arrived back in London, via Rio de Janeiro, on 30 April 1789. 

John Mason died of scurvy on the return voyage.

English sailors
Deaths from scurvy
Year of death unknown
Year of birth unknown
People who died at sea
First Fleet